Lyon–Saint Exupéry Airport, formerly known as Lyon Satolas Airport , is the international airport of Lyon, the third-biggest city in France and an important transport facility for the entire Auvergne-Rhône-Alpes region. The airport is 30 minutes from the Lyon-Part-Dieu business district by the Rhônexpress tram.

History

Early years
The airport was inaugurated by President Valéry Giscard d'Estaing on 12 April 1975, and opened to passengers a week later. It was designed to replace the old Lyon–Bron Airport, which is now only used for general aviation.

In 1994, the LGV Rhône-Alpes high-speed rail line brought TGV service to the airport, providing direct trains to Paris and Marseille. The fan-shaped canopy of the Gare de Lyon Saint-Exupéry, designed by architect Santiago Calatrava, is the airport's most notable architectural feature.

Since 1997, the airport has been a focus city for the airline Air France.

Development since the 2000s
The airport was originally named Lyon Satolas Airport, after the nearby eponymous village, but in 2000 the airport and train station were renamed in honour of Lyonnais aviation pioneer and writer Antoine de Saint-Exupéry, on the centenary of his birth. He was a native of Lyon, and a laureate of the Grand Prix du roman de l'Académie française, and died in World War II.

In 2013, the airport served 8,562,298 passengers, an increase of 1.3% over the previous year. Air freight increased by 22.7% to 44,820 tonnes, although overall aircraft movements dropped by 2.8% to 113,420.

Facilities
The airport consists of passenger terminals 1 and 2 which are interconnected on the landside by a central building that itself has a foot-bridge to the nearby Gare de Lyon Saint-Exupéry high-speed railway station and the Rhônexpress terminus. The airport also features two runways as well as cargo facilities. A total of 16,000 car spaces in four car parks (P2-P5) are available. Two of the parks are underground (P2 and P3) while the long-stay parks (P4 and P5) are located at a distance from the terminals behind the railway station.

Terminal 1
Terminal 1 consists of two parts: The older part is a two-storey, slightly curved, brick shape building which contains the check-in areas 11, 12, 14, 18 and 19 as well as departure areas G and F on the upper level with the arrivals on the ground level. In 2014, Aéroports de Lyon started the construction of a new terminal expansion, which doubled the capacity and the area, with 70,000 m2. Four groups took part in the tender process to design and develop the expanded Terminal 1. The bid was won by the GFC Construction company in partnership with Quille Construction (Bouygues) and Bouygues Energies & Services. The architectural practice was Rogers Stirk Harbour + Partners led by Graham Stirk, Chabanne and Partners, engineers Technip TPS and Cap Ingélec, and Inddigo. The expanded Terminal 1 opened in June 2018. It has a circular shape with check-in area 10 and additional arrivals facilities on the ground level and departure gates B and C on both upper levels. It is also connected by a tunnel to a small satellite building containing the D gates, now mainly used by easyJet and Transavia France, while the other areas serve Star Alliance carriers and Emirates, among others.

Terminal 2
Terminal 2 is a duplicate of the older part of Terminal 1, containing check-in areas 20 and 21 with boarding areas Q and P on the upper level and arrivals facilities on the lower level. This terminal area is mainly used by Air France.

Terminal 3 (defunct)
The former Terminal 3 was a very basic facility used by low-cost carriers. It was demolished during Terminal 1 expansion. The satellite building is still open, however; it now houses the ‘D’ gates for low cost airlines such as easyJet.

Airlines and destinations

Passenger

Cargo

Statistics

Ground transportation

Rail
The Rhônexpress tramway began operations in August 2010 and links Gare de Lyon-Part-Dieu east of Lyon's city centre with Gare de Lyon Saint-Exupéry next to the airport in approximately 30 minutes using and sharing existing tracks of the Lyon tramway as well as a newly constructed route. This tramway replaced the former coach shuttle services (Satobus) that operated beforehand leaving the airport with no other public connections to the city centre.

The Gare de Lyon Saint-Exupéry station is also served by the LGV Rhône-Alpes high speed rail line.

Coach
Coach links connect the airport with the centre of other towns in the area including Grenoble (at least once an hour), Saint-Étienne and Chambéry. Bus operators also offer a coach shuttle service to the surrounding French ski resorts, including Tignes, Val d'Isere, Val Thorens and more.

Since January 2020, two buses from Transports en commun lyonnais are stopping at the airport:
- The bus 47, from Meyzieu, connecting with Tram line 3 (from Gare Part-Dieu) to Saint-Laurent-de-Mure, connecting with Bus line 1E (from Grange Blanche) via the airport. The line operates 7 days a week, from 5:30am to 11:45pm, every 30 minutes.
- The bus 48, from Genas to the airport.

Electric car service
The airport has an electric car sharing station. Bolloré Bluecar vehicles are available for rent.

See also
 Antoine de Saint Exupéry Airport (Argentina)
 List of the busiest airports in France

References

External links

 
 Aéroport de Lyon-Saint Exupéry (Union des aéroports français)

Airfields of the United States Army Air Forces in France
Airports established in 1975
Airports in Auvergne-Rhône-Alpes
Antoine de Saint-Exupéry
Buildings and structures in Rhône (department)
Transport in Lyon
World War II airfields in France
1975 establishments in France